was a village located in Kami District, Kōchi Prefecture, Japan.

As of 2003, the village had an estimated population of 2,924 and a density of 10.04 persons per km². The total area was 291.12 km².

On March 1, 2006, Monobe, along with the towns of Kahoku and Tosayamada (all from Kami District), was merged to create the city of Kami and no longer exists as an independent municipality.

External links
 Official website of Kami 

Dissolved municipalities of Kōchi Prefecture
Onmyōdō
Kami, Kōchi